Attila Adrovicz (born 8 April 1966) is a Hungarian sprint canoer who competed from the late 1980s to the mid-1990s.

Career 
He won a silver medal in the K-4 1000 m event at the 1996 Summer Olympics in Atlanta.

Adrovicz also won four medals at the ICF Canoe Sprint World Championships with three silvers (K-2 500 m: 1986, 1994; K-4 500 m: 1991) and a bronze (K-2 1000 m: 1989).

References

Sports-reference.com profile

1966 births
Canoeists at the 1996 Summer Olympics
Hungarian male canoeists
Living people
Olympic canoeists of Hungary
Olympic silver medalists for Hungary
Olympic medalists in canoeing
ICF Canoe Sprint World Championships medalists in kayak
Medalists at the 1996 Summer Olympics
20th-century Hungarian people